David Hislop (born 3 February 1959) is an Australian cross-country skier. He competed at the 1984 Winter Olympics and the 1988 Winter Olympics.

References

1959 births
Living people
Australian male cross-country skiers
Olympic cross-country skiers of Australia
Cross-country skiers at the 1984 Winter Olympics
Cross-country skiers at the 1988 Winter Olympics
Skiers from Sydney
20th-century Australian people